John Poulett may refer to:

 John Poulett, 1st Baron Poulett, (1585–1649), English sailor and politician who sat in the House of Commons
 John Poulett, 2nd Baron Poulett, (1615–1665),  English peer and Member of Parliament
 John Poulett, 3rd Baron Poulett (c. 1641–1679), English peer
 John Poulett, 1st Earl Poulett (1663–1743), English peer, the son of John Poulett, 3rd Baron Poulett
 John Poulett, 2nd Earl Poulett (1708–1764), English peer, known as Viscount Hinton from birth until 1743
 John Poulett, 4th Earl Poulett (1756–1819), English peer and militia officer
 John Poulett, 5th Earl Poulett (1783–1864), English peer and militia officer

See also 
 John Paulet (disambiguation)